Rory Suttor (born 23 June 1998 in Australia) is an Australian rugby union player who plays for the New South Wales Waratahs in Super Rugby. His playing position is flanker. He has signed for the Waratahs squad in 2019.

Reference list

External links
Rugby.com.au profile
itsrugby.co.uk profile

1998 births
Australian rugby union players
Living people
Rugby union flankers